Alumni Stadium is a football stadium located on the lower campus of Boston College in Chestnut Hill, Massachusetts, approximately  west of downtown Boston. It is the home of the Boston College Eagles. Its present seating capacity is 44,500. Officially, the stadium is part of the Brighton neighborhood of Boston, although it has a Chestnut Hill address.

History

Alumni Field, Boston College's first stadium, opened in 1915 and was located just south of Gasson Quadrangle, on the site of the present Stokes Hall, an academic building for the humanities that opened in 2013. Before the building of Stokes, the area was known as The Dustbowl, a nickname that originated as a description of Alumni Field in the years when it was intensely used as a practice field, a baseball diamond, and a running track. Formally dedicated "as a memorial to the boys that were" on October 30, 1915, Alumni Field and its distinctive "maroon goal-posts on a field of green" were hailed in that evening's edition of the Boston Saturday Evening Transcript as "one of the sights in Boston." The original grandstands, which could accommodate 2,200 spectators in 1915, were enlarged over the subsequent years to 25,000. Nonetheless Alumni Field often proved too small for BC football games, which were frequently held at Fenway Park, and later Braves Field, beginning in the 1930s.

On September 21, 1957, Alumni Stadium opened on Boston College's lower campus. The new stadium incorporated a football field encircled by a regulation track with a seating capacity of 26,000. The dedication game, a match-up with the Midshipmen of the U.S. Naval Academy, was orchestrated with the help of BC benefactor and then-Massachusetts Senator John F. Kennedy. Kennedy, who had received his honorary degree at Commencement Exercises in Alumni Field the previous year, would return to Alumni Stadium on a number of occasions over the course of his political career, including a 1963 Convocation Address, one of his last public appearances.

Alumni Stadium has hosted numerous intellectual and cultural luminaries, religious leaders and heads of state as the venue for Boston College's annual Commencement Exercises since 1957. In addition to being the permanent home of the Boston College football team, Alumni Stadium hosted the Boston Patriots of the American Football League during the 1969 season.

As the home of the Boston College Eagles, Alumni Stadium has been the site of numerous notable moments in Boston College football history. On September 17, 2005, Alumni Stadium hosted BC's inaugural game as a member of the Atlantic Coast Conference.

Renovations

In 1971, the stadium was expanded to 32,000 seats and artificial turf and lights were installed. The stadium was rebuilt again in 1988 as matching upper decks and a new press box were added. The stadium underwent a major renovation before the 1994 season which eliminated the track and increased capacity to 44,500. Since 1998, a -high bubble of inflatable vinyl has covered the stadium from December to March and allowed the field to be used as a winter practice facility. The field surface itself was converted to FieldTurf before the 2004 season. In the summer before the 2005 football season, the $27 million Yawkey Athletics Center opened at Alumni Stadium's north end zone, and the logo of the Atlantic Coast Conference was added to the FieldTurf. For the 2012 season, Alumni Stadium was outfitted with new FieldTurf.

See also
 List of NCAA Division I FBS football stadiums

References

External links

American Football League venues
Boston College Eagles football venues
Boston Patriots (AFL) stadiums
College football venues
Defunct athletics (track and field) venues in the United States
Defunct National Football League venues
American football venues in Massachusetts
Sports venues in Boston
1957 establishments in Massachusetts
Sports venues completed in 1957
Boston Minutemen
North American Soccer League (1968–1984) stadiums